Uzma Khan is a Pakistani politician hailing from the village of Mayar Jandol, Samar Bagh Tehsil, Lower Dir, belong to Jamiat Ulema-e Islam (F). She is currently serving as a member of the Khyber Pakhtunkhwa Assembly. She is also serving as the committee member of the Standing Committee No. 34 on Labour Department, Standing Committee No. 26 on Elementary and Secondary Education Department, and the Standing Committee No. 23 on Administration Department.

Education and career 
She got her degrees in Shahadatul Aalamia, BCS and MA. She also served as member of the Khyber Pakhtunkhwa Assembly from 2008 to 2013.

References

Living people
Pashtun women
Khyber Pakhtunkhwa MPAs 2013–2018
Jamiat Ulema-e-Islam (F) politicians
People from Lower Dir District
Year of birth missing (living people)